Clifford Thrift (born May 3, 1956) is a former professional American football player who played linebacker for eight seasons for the San Diego Chargers, Chicago Bears, and Los Angeles Rams. Thrift attended Purcell High School in Purcell, Oklahoma and was a member of the 1972 Purcell Football Class A State Championship Team. He then attended East Central University in Ada, Oklahoma before being drafted into the National Football League (NFL).

1956 births
Living people
American football linebackers
Chicago Bears players
San Diego Chargers players
Los Angeles Rams players
East Central Tigers football players